Denopamine (INN) is a cardiotonic drug which acts as a β1 adrenergic receptor agonist. It is used in the treatment of angina and may also have potential uses in the treatment of congestive heart failure and for clearing pulmonary oedema. It is marketed in Japan under the brand name Kalgut (カルグート) and available as tablets of 5 and 10 mg, and 5% fine granules.

References 

Beta1-adrenergic agonists
Phenylethanolamines
Catechol ethers
Phenols